Barnstormer, Barnstorm or Barnstorming may refer to:


Sports
 Barnstorming, aerial stunts performed for entertainment, popular in the 1920s
 Barnstorming (sports), athletic practice of traveling and playing exhibition matches outside of established leagues
 Iowa Barnstormers, a professional indoor football team from Des Moines, Iowa, U.S.
 Lancaster Barnstormers,  a professional baseball team from Lancaster, Pennsylvania, U.S.

Arts and entertainment
 Barnstorm (band), an American rock band 1972–74
 Barnstorm (album), 1972
 Barnstormer (ride), a thrill ride at Dollywood in Pigeon Forge, Tennessee, U.S.
 The Barnstormer, a junior roller coaster at Walt Disney World in Florida, U.S.
 The Barnstormer (film), a 1922 American silent comedy film
 "Barnstormers", an episode of The Shield TV series
 Barnstormer (band), a music project of Attila the Stockbroker
Barnstorming (video game), for the Atari 2600, 1982

Other uses
 Fisher Barnstormer, a biplane ultralight aircraft
 Operation Barnstormer, a 2006 coalition military operation of the Iraq War
 Ashley and Shane Barnstormer, characters from the 2014 web series Video Game High School

See also